This is a list of football clubs in Dominica.
Roseau soft boys 
Centre Bath Estate FC
Dublanc FC
Harlem United FC
LIME Pointe Michel FC
Nagico Bombers
Quick Zone Icons
Sagicor South East United((grand fond Young boyz FC
Starrin and Sons St Joseph FC

Dominica
 
Football clubs